Hazeldale is an unincorporated community in Washington County, Oregon, United States. It is located along Farmington Road south of Reedville and west of Aloha.

References

Inspiration for the town of Hazel in Neville Shute's novel "Beyond the Black Stump"?

Unincorporated communities in Washington County, Oregon
Unincorporated communities in Oregon